Márton Markó (born 7 December 1988) is a Hungarian former competitive figure skater. He is a four-time Hungarian national champion.

Programs

Competitive highlights

References

External links 

 
 Marton Marko at Tracings

1988 births
Hungarian male single skaters
Living people
Figure skaters from Budapest